Erik Ruben Svensson (born 28 November 1953) is a Swedish former footballer who played as a right back, most notably for IFK Göteborg.

References

External links
 
 

1953 births
Living people
Swedish footballers
Association football defenders
IFK Göteborg players
Västra Frölunda IF players
UEFA Cup winning players
People from Karlskoga Municipality
Sportspeople from Örebro County